John Donald Bruce Miller  (1922–2011), known as Bruce Miller, was an Australian academic.

Education
Miller was educated first at Bondi Public School and then at Sydney Boys High School, completing his education part time at the University of Sydney. Miller obtained his Masters of Economics in 1951. Miller then obtained his MA at the University of Cambridge.

Career
In 1946 Miller joined the faculty of the University of Sydney.
From the mid 50's to early 60's Miller was at the University of Leicester, first as foundation chair in politics, and later as dean of social sciences.
Miller joined the Australian National University in 1962 in the Department of International Relations. Miller retired in 1987.

In 1963, Miller delivered the fifth in the annual series of ABC Boyer Lectures on "Australian and Foreign Policy".

Personal
Miller was born on 30 August 1922 in Sydney, son of Donald and Marian Miller.
Miller was married three times and had two sons. He died in Canberra on 16 January 2011.

Honours and awards
 1967 Elected Fellow of the Academy of the Social Sciences in Australia

References

1922 births
2011 deaths
University of Sydney alumni
Alumni of the University of Cambridge
Academic staff of the Australian National University
Academics of the University of Leicester
Academic staff of the University of Sydney
People educated at Sydney Boys High School
Fellows of the Academy of the Social Sciences in Australia